Mark Reale (June 7, 1955 – January 25, 2012) was an American guitarist who was the sole consistent and founding member of the heavy metal band Riot (now known as Riot V).

Biography 
Reale was born in Brooklyn, New York City, in 1955. He grew up listening to the Beatles, Eric Clapton, Gary Moore, Ritchie Blackmore and lists George Harrison as one of his greatest influences. After attending concerts by Ronnie Montrose, Rick Derringer and Edgar Winter he decided to become a guitarist, forming the band Riot in 1975 who are still active to the present day.

Mark Reale was the principal songwriter and main creative force behind Riot starting with the band's 1977 debut album Rock City. The group's most acclaimed album was 1981's seminal Fire Down Under, the last of three studio albums to feature original vocalist Guy Speranza. Other notable records include Restless Breed (1982), the band's comeback album, Thundersteel (1988), and its follow-up, The Privilege of Power (1990). Riot's last album to feature Reale was Immortal Soul, released in 2011. Riot has toured all around the world and been a support act for major acts such as Kiss, AC/DC, Sammy Hagar, Molly Hatchet, and Rush while maintaining a particularly strong fanbase in Japan and continental Europe.

After Riot's temporary breakup following the Born In America (1983) release, Reale formed a short-lived outfit named Narita with former members of S.A. Slayer, including future Riot bassist Don Van Stavern. The band recorded a sole demo in 1984 before calling it quits. Reale decided to re-activate Riot which led to a new record deal with CBS Records and the Thundersteel album in 1988. In 1998, Reale co-founded the group Westworld with vocalist Tony Harnell of TNT fame. Westworld released three studio albums and one live disc between 1999 and 2002.

Death 
On January 25, 2012, Reale died of complications related to Crohn's disease. Reale, who had Crohn's disease most of his life, had been in a coma since January 11 due to a subarachnoid hemorrhage.

Discography

with Riot 
Rock City (1977)
Narita (1979)
Fire Down Under (1981)
Restless Breed (1982)
Born In America (1983)
Thundersteel (1988)
The Privilege of Power (1990)
Nightbreaker (1993)
The Brethren of the Long House (1996)
Inishmore (1998)
Shine On Live In Japan (1998)Sons of Society (1999)Through the Storm (2002)Army of One (2006)Immortal Soul (2011)

 with Westworld 
 Westworld (1999)
 Skin (2000)
 Live... In the Flesh (2001)
 Cyberdreams'' (2002)

References

External links 
Official website
Official Facebook page
Metal Heaven – Europe Label Riot Artist page
RIOT Guitarist Mark Reale Passes

1955 births
2012 deaths
American heavy metal guitarists
Deaths from Crohn's disease
Musicians from Brooklyn
Guitarists from New York (state)
20th-century American guitarists
Riot (band) members
American male guitarists
20th-century American male musicians